While the City Sleeps, We Rule the Streets is the debut studio album by Cobra Starship. It was released on October 10, 2006 in the US, and on October 17, 2006 in Canada. A rough clip of "Send My Love to the Dancefloor, I'll See You In Hell (Hey Mister DJ)", a finished version of "Snakes on a Plane (Bring It)", and "The Church of Hot Addiction" were uploaded onto Cobra Starship's PureVolume site. "The Church of Hot Addiction" was also used as the theme song for the WWE's Great American Bash 2007. It has sold more than 69,000 copies to date.

Background
Cobra Starship was formed in 2005 after Midtown bassist Gabe Saporta took a trip to the deserts of Arizona. During this time, Saporta went on a "vision quest", spending time with Native American tribes and smoking peyote. He began to create his vision for a new band, a melodic style of music heavily influenced by synthpop and hip hop. Upon returning home, Saporta rented a house in the Catskill Mountains and began writing what would become While the City Sleeps, We Rule the Streets. He posted a parody response to Gwen Stefani's "Hollaback Girl" titled "Hollaback Boy" on Myspace. The song gained Saporta notoriety on the internet and he eventually signed to Fall Out Boy bassist Pete Wentz's label, Decaydance Records.

Gabe Saporta stated that most of the songs from this recording particularly concern his personal life and career: "Being from Jersey Means Never Having to Say You're Sorry" centers on feelings of emptiness and hopelessness, regarding the area he was (partly) brought-up in, while "The Ballad of Big Poppa and Diamond Girl" concerns a quiet young girl he met at a disco in Los Angeles.

Music
On While the City Sleeps, We Rule the Streets Saporta abandons the "voice-quivering drama and super-intense rock" of Midtown in favor of "a more lighthearted, groove-oriented style".  The album begins with an acoustic intro entitled "Being from Jersey Means Never Having to Say You're Sorry".  The opening of "Send My Love to the Dancefloor, I'll See You in Hell (Hey Mister DJ)" has been compared to U2, while the Glenn Gamboa of the Chicago Tribune likened the song's chorus to Madonna's "Music". The song features "'70s synth whistles and an '80s new wave bass line".

Track listing

References

External links
 Cobra Starship's PureVolume page

2006 debut albums
Cobra Starship albums
Albums produced by S*A*M and Sluggo
Fueled by Ramen albums